Sclerocactus polyancistrus is a species of cactus known by several common names, including redspined fishhook cactus, Mojave fishhook cactus, pineapple cactus, and hermit cactus.

Distribution
Sclerocactus polyancistrus is native to the Mojave Desert in eastern California and southern Nevada. It grows in desert scrub, woodlands, and canyons, often on limestone substrate.

Description
The Sclerocactus polyancistrus cactus has a cylindrical stem up to 25 centimeters tall by 8 wide. They may grow in clusters. The cactus is densely spiny, each areole has several reddish or white central spines with hooked tips and several more white spines around the edge.

The fragrant flower is up to 10 centimeters wide and may be most any shade of pink or red-violet. The scaly, fleshy fruit is 2 or 3 centimeters long.

References

External links
Jepson Manual Treatment: Sclerocactus polyancistrus
USDA Plants Profile: Sclerocactus polyancistrus
Flora of North America: Sclerocactus polyancistrus
Sclerocactus polyancistrus Photo gallery

polyancistrus
Cacti of the United States
Flora of the California desert regions
Flora of Nevada
Natural history of the Mojave Desert
Flora without expected TNC conservation status